A fingerprint is a mark made by the pattern of ridges on the pad of a human finger.

Fingerprint may also refer to:

Science and technology
 Genetic fingerprint, distinguishing two individuals of the same species using only samples of their DNA
 Peptide mass fingerprinting, in biochemistry, identification of proteins
 Fingerprint (computing), uniquely identifying data by extracting from it a small key known as a fingerprint
 Public key fingerprint, a string of bytes identifying a cryptographic public key
 Acoustic fingerprint, in audio technology, unique code generated from audio samples, allowing computer identification of music
 Digital video fingerprinting, generates unique codes from digital video samples, and is used for automated copyright enforcement
 TCP/IP stack fingerprinting, identifying computer operating systems from network packets
 Device fingerprint, harvesting of software and hardware settings from a remote computing device
 Canvas fingerprinting, a browser fingerprinting technique for tracking users
 Rabin fingerprint
 Ballistic fingerprinting, a set of forensic techniques that to match a bullet to the gun it was fired with
 Radio fingerprinting, characteristic signature from minute variations of frequencies emitted by a radio frequency device
 Isotopic fingerprint, characteristic ratios of isotopes in material
 Fingerprint, in the forensic identification of a typewriter
 Fingerprint, in the forensic identification of a paper shredder

Arts
 Fingerprints (comics), the Southland Tales graphic novel
 Finger Prints (book), a book published by Francis Galton in 1892
 Finger Prints (film), a lost 1927 silent film directed by Lloyd Bacon
 Finger Prints (serial), a lost 1931 Universal serial directed by Ray Taylor
 Fingerprints (film), 2006
 Fingerprint (album), by Mark Heard
 Fingerprints (Peter Frampton album), 2006
 Fingerprints (Amelia Lily album)
 Fingerprints (Eli Young Band album), 2017
 "Fingerprint", a song by Leona Lewis from her 2012 album Glassheart
 "Fingerprints", a song by The Black Heart Procession from their 2002 album Amore del Tropico
 "Fingerprints", a series of songs by They Might Be Giants from their 1992 album Apollo 18
 "Fingerprints", a song by Katy Perry from her 2008 album One of the Boys
 "Fingerprints", a song by Chick Corea from his 2013 album Trilogy
 "Fingerprints", a song by Minipop from their 2007 album A New Hope

See also
 Glove prints, a mark made by the pattern of a glove that is worn over the human hand
 Dermatoglyphics, the scientific study of fingerprints
 Multiple Intelligences
 The Myth of Fingerprints, a 1997 film starring Julianne Moore
 Fingerprints of the Gods, a 1995 alternative science text
 Fingerprints: The Best of Powderfinger, 1994–2000, Powderfinger's 'best-of' compilation
 Fingerprint Records, record label and recording studio owned by Mark Heard